This is a list of notable politicians from Somaliland.

Presidents
 Abdirahman Ahmed Ali Tuur – first President of Somaliland
 Muhammad Haji Ibrahim Egal – second President of Somaliland
 Dahir Rayale Kahin – third President of Somaliland
 Ahmed Mohamed Mohamoud – fourth President of Somaliland
 Muse Bihi Abdi – current and fifth President of Somaliland

Vice presidents
 Hassan Isse Jama – first Vice President of Somaliland
 Abdirahman Aw Ali Farrah – second Vice President of Somaliland
 Dahir Rayale Kahin – third Vice President of Somaliland
 Ahmed Yusuf Yasin – fourth Vice President of Somaliland
 Abdirahman Saylici  – current and sixth Vice President of Somaliland

Ministers
 Yasin Haji Mohamoud – Member of Somaliland Parliament, former Foreign Minister, former Minister of Education, and former Minister of Interior
 Mohamed Kahin Ahmed – current Minister of Interior
 Dr. Saad Ali Shire – current Minister of Finance, former Foreign Minister and former Minister of Planning
 Abdiqani Mohamoud Aateye – current Minister of Defence and former Minister of Justice
 Mohamed Muse Diriye – current Minister of Water and former Minister of Information
 Omar Ali Abdillahi – current Minister of Health
 Ahmed Mumin Seed – former Minister of Agriculture
 Jama Mohamoud Egal – current Minister of Energy and Minerals
 Mohamoud Hassan Saad – current Minister of Commerce, Industries and Tourism
 Yusuf Mire Mohamed – former Minister of Youth and Sports
 Ahmed Mohamed Diriye – current Minister of Education and Science
 Abdirashid Haji Duale – current Minister of Youth and Sports
 Abdiweli Sheikh Abdillahi – current Minister of Telecommunications
 Hinda Jama Hersi 
 Shukri Haji Ismail
 Mustafe Mohamoud Ali 
 Mohamed Ahmed Mohamoud 
 Hassan Mohammed Ali 
 Khalil Abdillahi Ahmed
 Said Sulub Mohamed 
 Mohamed Adan Elmi 
 Abdillahi Abokor Osman
 Saleban Yusuf Ali – current Minister of Information, Guidance and Culture
 Hussein Abdi Dualeh –former Minister of Energy and Minerals
 Mohammad Abdullahi Omar – former Foreign Minister
 Suleiman Haglotosiye – former Minister of Health
 Ali Said Raygal – former Minister of Youth and Sports
 Adan Ahmed Elmi – former Minister of Agriculture
 Edna Adan Ismail – former Foreign Minister
 Hassan Haji Mohamoud – former Minister of Education
 Hussein Ali Duale – former Minister of Finance
 Mohamed Yonis – former Foreign Minister

Other politicians
 Abdikarim Ahmed Mooge – current mayor of Hargeisa
 Abdurrahman Mahmoud Aidiid – former mayor of Hargeisa
 Bashe Mohamed Farah – former Speaker of the House of Representatives of Somaliland
 Mahamed-Amin Omar Abdi current mayor of Gabiley
 Abdishakur Mohamoud Hassan – current mayor of Berbera
 Ali Ibrahim Jama – former governor of Somaliland's Central Bank
 Abdirahman Mohamed Abdullahi – former Speaker of the House of Representatives of Somaliland
 Ali Omar Mohamed – former manager of Berbera Port
 Mohamed Hassan Maidane – former mayor of Borama and current MP of Somaliland
 Hussein Mohamed Jiciir – former mayor of Hargeisa
 Adan Haji Ali – current chief justice of Somaliland
 Faysal Ali Warabe – chairman of the UCID party
 Yusuf Warsame Saeed – former mayor of Hargeisa
 Khadra Haji Ismail yonis (X Geid) – former deputy mayor of Gebiley former general director of presidential palaces 
 Khadra Hussein Mohammad – former national deputy prosecutor of Somaliland